Nothing Left to Lose may refer to:

Literature
 Nothing Left to Lose (novel), a 2017 novel by Dan Wells
 Nothing Left to Lose, a 2012 novel by Allan G. Johnson
 Nothing Left to Lose: An Impolite Report On the State of Freedom in Canada, a 2020 book by Philip Slayton
 "Nothing Left to Lose", a short story by Diana Pharaoh Francis

Music

Albums
 Nothing Left to Lose (Gary U.S. Bonds album) or the title song, 1996
 Nothing Left to Lose (Mat Kearney album) or the title song (see below), 2006

Songs
 "Nothing Left to Lose" (song), by Mat Kearney, 2006
 "Nothing Left to Lose", by the Alan Parsons Project from The Turn of a Friendly Card, 1980
 "Nothing Left to Lose", by American Hi-Fi from The Art of Losing, 2003
 "Nothing Left to Lose", by Buck-O-Nine from Sustain, 2007
 "Nothing Left to Lose", by Deepfield, 2011
 "Nothing Left to Lose", by Emma Paki from Oxygen of Love, 1996
 "Nothing Left to Lose", by Faron Young, 1965
 "Nothing Left to Lose", by Heaven's Basement from Filthy Empire, 2013
 "Nothing Left to Lose", by Needtobreathe from The Heat, 2007
 "Nothing Left to Lose", by Nick Carter from I'm Taking Off, 2011
 "Nothing Left to Lose", by the Pretty Reckless from Light Me Up, 2010
 "Nothing Left to Lose", by Puddle of Mudd from Life on Display, 2003
 "Nothing Left to Lose", by Sad Café from Facades, 1979
 "Nothing Left to Lose", by Social Code from Rock 'n' Roll, 2009
 "Nothing Left to Lose", by Spencer Albee from Relentlessly Yours, 2017
 "Nothing Left to Lose", by Taxi Violence
 "Nothing Left to Lose", by Transit from Joyride, 2014
 "Nothing Left to Lose", by Wipers from Land of the Lost, 1986
 "Nothing Left to Lose", by Woe, Is Me from Genesis, 2012

Television episodes
 "Nothing Left to Lose" (30 Rock)
 "Nothing Left to Lose" (Police Woman)
 "Nothing Left to Lose" (Side Order of Life)

See also
 Nothing to Lose (disambiguation)